Huns and Hyphens is a 1918 American silent comedy film featuring Larry Semon and Stan Laurel.

Cast
 Larry Semon as Larry
 Madge Kirby as Vera Bright
 Stan Laurel as Gang member
 Mae Laurel as Woman
 William McCall as Customer (credited as Billy McCall)
 Frank Alexander as Cafe owner (credited as Fatty Alexander)
 William Hauber as Waiter (credited as Bill Hauber)
 Pete Gordon as Waiter
 Eddie Baker as German Agent (uncredited)
 John Rand as Unhappy Customer (uncredited)

Reception
Like many American films of the time, Huns and Hyphens was subject to cuts by city and state film censorship boards. For example, the Chicago Board of Censors required a cut, in Reel 1, of the episode of squirting seltzer water at a man's trousers and the actions following.

See also
 List of American films of 1918

References

External links

 (Inter-Pathé channel)

1918 films
1918 short films
American silent short films
American black-and-white films
1918 comedy films
Films directed by Larry Semon
Silent American comedy films
American comedy short films
1910s American films